Lamiini is a tribe of longhorn beetles of the subfamily Lamiinae.

Genera

 Acalolepta Pascoe, 1858
 Achthophora Newman, 1842
 Aethalodes Gahan, 1888
 Agnia Newman, 1842
 Agniohammus Breuning, 1936
 Agniolamia Breuning
 Agniomorpha Breuning, 1935
 Agniopsis Breuning, 1936
 Agnoderus Thomson, 1864
 Amechana J. Thomson, 1864
 Anamera Thomson, 1864
 Anameromorpha Pic, 1923
 Anhammus J. Thomson, 1860
 Annamanum Pic, 1925
 Anoplophora Hope, 1839
 Anoplophoroides Breuning, 1980
 Anthores Pascoe, 1869
 Archidice J. Thomson, 1864
 Arctolamia Gestro, 1888
 Aristobia J. Thomson, 1868
 Batomena Bates, 1884
 Bixadoides Breuning, 1966
 Bixadus Pascoe, 1868
 Blepephaeopsis Breuning, 1938
 Blepephaeus Pascoe, 1866
 Brachyhammus Kolbe
 Callipyrga Newman, 1842
 Cereopsius Pascoe, 1857
 Cerosterna Dejean, 1835
 Cesonium Dillon & Dillon, 1959
 Chyptodes Dillon & Dillon, 1941
 Cinctohammus Dillon & Dillon, 1959
 Combe Thomson, 1864
 Cordoxylamia Dillon & Dillon, 1959
 Cornuscoparia Jordan, 1894
 Coscinesthes Bates, 1890
 Cratotragus Lacordaire, 1869
 Cremnosterna Aurivillius, 1920
 Cribragapanthia Pic, 1903
 Cribrihammus Dillon & Dillon, 1959
 Cribrochamus Dillon & Dillon, 1961
 Cribrohammus Breuning, 1966
 Crucihammus Breuning, 1936
 Cyanagapanthia Breuning, 1968
 Cyriotasiastes Heller, 1924
 Decellia Breuning, 1968
 Deliathis Thomson, 1860
 Diallus Pascoe, 1866
 Didyochamus Dillon & Dillon, 1959
 Docohammus Aurivillius, 1908
 Docolamia Breuning, 1944
 Dohertyorsidis Breuning, 1961
 Dolichoprosopus Ritsema, 1881
 Domitia Thomson, 1858
 Epepeotes Pascoe, 1866
 Epicedia J. Thomson, 1864
 Epuraecha Breuning, 1935
 Eryalus Pascoe, 1888
 Eudihammus Breuning, 1944
 Euoplia Hope, 1939
 Eupromus Pascoe, 1868
 Eusyntheta Bates, 1889
 Eutaenia J. Thomson, 1857
 Euthyastus Pascoe, 1866
 Falsacalolepta Breuning, 1970
 Falsagnia Breuning, 1938
 Falsocylindropomus Pic, 1927
 Falsodihammus Breuning, 1942
 Falsomelanauster Breuning, 1940
 Gerania Audinet-Serville, 1835
 Gibbohammus Wang & Chiang, 1999
 Goes LeConte, 1852
 Granolamia Breuning, 1944
 Granulorsidis Breuning, 1980
 Guttulamia Dillon & Dillon, 1959
 Hainanhammus Gressitt, 1940
 Hammatoderus Gemminger & Harold, 1873
 Haplothrix Gahan, 1888
 Hebestola Haldeman, 1847
 Hechinoschema Thomson, 1857
 Hotarionomus J. Thomson, 1857
 Insulochamus Dillon & Dillon, 1961
 Ippitoides Dillon & Dillon, 1959
 Jeanvoinea Pic, 1934
 Laelida Pascoe, 1866
 Lamia Fabricius, 1775
 Lamiomimus Kolbe, 1886
 Leprodera J. Thomson, 1857
 Lesbra Dillon & Dillon, 1959
 Leuronotus Gahan, 1888
 Lochmodocerus Burne, 1984
 Macrochenus Guérin-Méneville, 1843
 Macrohammus Aurivillius, 1886
 Magninia Clermont, 1932
 Marmaroglypha Redtenbacher, 1868
 Mecynippus Bates, 1884
 Melanopolia Bates, 1884
 Meliochamus Dillon & Dillon, 1959
 Metaperiaptodes Breuning, 1943
 Metopides Pascoe, 1866
 Metoxylamia Dillon & Dillon, 1959
 Microgoes Casey, 1913
 Migsideres Gilmour, 1948
 Mimepuraecha Breuning, 1974
 Mimocoelosterna Breuning, 1940
 Mimocornuscoparia Breuning, 1970
 Mimocratotragus Pic, 1926
 Mimognoma Breuning, 1959
 Mimohammus Aurivillius, 1911
 Mimoleprodera Breuning, 1938
 Mimoleuronotus Breuning, 1968
 Mimolochus Thomson, 1868
 Mimomyagrus Breuning, 1970
 Mimonephelotes Breuning, 1970
 Mimonephelotus Breuning, 1940
 Mimopsacothea Breuning, 1973
 Mimorsidis Breuning, 1938
 Mimothestus Pic, 1935
 Mimotriammatus Breuning, 1972
 Mimotrysimia Breuning, 1948
 Mimoxylamia Breuning, 1977
 Monochamus Dejean, 1821
 Murzinia Lazarev, 2011
 Myagrus Pascoe, 1878
 Nanohammus Bates, 1884
 Nemophas Thomson, 1864
 Nemoplophora Wallin, Torstein & Nýlander, 2014
 Neodihammus Breuning, 1935
 Neoptychodes Dillon & Dillon, 1941
 Neoxenicotela Breuning, 1947
 Nephelotus Pascoe, 1866
 Nigrolamia Dillon & Dillon, 1959
 Nonochamus Dillon & Dillon, 1959
 Oculohammus Breuning & de Jong, 1941
 Odontolamia Breuning, 1944
 Omocyrius Pascoe, 1866
 Orsidis Pascoe, 1866
 Oxyhammus Kolbe, 1894
 Oxylamia Breuning, 1944
 Parabixadus Breuning, 1935
 Paracyriothasastes Breuning, 1978
 Paradiallus Breuning, 1950
 Paradihammus Breuning, 1935
 Paraepepeotes Pic, 1935
 Paragnia Gahan, 1893
 Paragniopsis Breuning, 1965
 Paraleprodera Breuning, 1935
 Paramelanauster Breuning, 1936
 Parametopides Breuning, 1936
 Paranamera Breuning, 1935
 Paranhammus Breuning, 1944
 Parapolytretus Breuning, 1944
 Parathyastus Aurivillius, 1913
 Parepicedia Breuning, 1943
 Pareutaenia Breuning, 1948
 Parhaplothrix Breuning, 1935
 Paruraecha Breuning, 1935
 Peblephaeus Kusama & Takakuwa, 1984
 Pelargoderus Audinet-Serville, 1835
 Penhammus Kolbe, 1894
 Periaptodes Pascoe, 1866
 Peribasis J. Thomson, 1864
 Pericycos Breuning, 1944
 Pharsalia Thomson, 1864
 Phrynetolamia Breuning, 1935
 Plectrodera Dejean, 1837
 Polytretus Gahan, 1893
 Potemnemus Thomson, 1864
 Prodomitia Jordan, 1894
 Psacothea Gahan, 1888
 Pseudanamera Breuning, 1935
 Pseudangulatus Dillon & Dillon, 1959
 Pseudanhammus Ritsema, 1889
 Pseudaristobia Breuning, 1943
 Pseudhammus Kolbe, 1894
 Pseudobixadus Breuning, 1936
 Pseudocelosterna Breuning, 1943
 Pseudocoedomea Breuning, 1971
 Pseudocyriocrates Breuning, 1935
 Pseudodihammus Breuning, 1936
 Pseudomacrochenus Breuning, 1942
 Pseudomeges Breuning, 1942
 Pseudometopides Breuning, 1936
 Pseudomonochamus Breuning, 1943
 Pseudomyagrus Breuning, 1944
 Pseudonemophas Breuning, 1944
 Pseudopsacothea Pic, 1935
 Pseudorsidis Breuning, 1944
 Pseudotaeniotes Dillon & Dillon, 1949
 Pseudothestus Breuning, 1943
 Pseudotrachystola Breuning, 1943
 Pseudoxenicotela Breuning, 1959
 Pseuduraecha Pic, 1925
 Ptychodes Audinet-Serville, 1835
 Rufohammus Breuning, 1939
 Sarothrocera White, 1864
 Spinaristobia Breuning, 1963
 Stegenagapanthia Pic, 1924
 Stegenodes Breuning, 1942
 Stegenus Pascoe, 1857
 Sternohammus Breuning, 1935
 Sternorsidis Breuning, 1959
 Strandiata Breuning, 1936
 Stratioceros Lacordaire, 1869
 Striatorsidis Breuning, 1960
 Superagnia Breuning, 1968
 Taeniotes Audinet-Serville, 1835
 Teocchiana Jiroux, Garreau, Bentanachs & Prévost, 2014
 Thermonotus Gahan, 1888
 Thestus Pascoe, 1866
 Thylactomimus Breuning, 1959
 Tomohammus Breuning, 1935
 Tomolamia Lameere, 1893
 Trachystohamus Pic, 1936
 Trachystola Pascoe, 1862
 Trachystolodes Breuning, 1943
 Triammatus Chevrolat, 1856
 Trichacalolepta Breuning, 1982
 Trichagnia Breuning, 1938
 Trichamechana Breuning, 1938
 Trichocoscinesthes Breuning, 1954
 Trichohammus Breuning, 1938
 Tricholamia Bates, 1884
 Trichomelanauster Breuning, 1983
 Trichomonochamus Breuning, 1953
 Trichonemophas Breuning, 1971
 Trichorsidis Breuning, 1965
 Trysimia Pascoe, 1866
 Tympanopalpus Redtenbacher, 1868
 Uraecha Thomson, 1864
 Uraechoides Breuning, 1981
 Xenicotelopsis Breuning, 1947
 Xenohammus Schwarzer, 1931
 Xoes Pascoe, 1866

References

 
Lamiinae
Beetle tribes